Rudolf Martin (1 July 1864 – 11 July 1925) was a Swiss anthropologist, specializing in physical anthropology. Martin's second wife, Stefanie Oppenheim, survived him and edited a second (1928) edition of his physical anthropology textbook.

Rudolf Martin’s Historical Archive 
Rudolf Martin was a Professor of Physical Anthropology in Munich, who had become inspired by the discovery of the ‘Java Man’ (Pithecanthropus erectus) in 1893 in Java, by the Dutch anthropologist Eugene Dubois. Dubois' publications on the 'Missing Link' became the CenterPoint of the Archive of Rudolf Martin, comprising more than 43,000 historical documents, manuscripts, scientific books and journals.

The Archive been safeguarded in 1940 from Germany just before WW II. It went to the Institute of Physical Anthropology of Utrecht University until the institute was discontinued in 1993. After rescuing it from destruction, Slikkerveer became the owner of the oldest palaeo-anthropological archive in the world. After many years of research within the Leiden Ethnosystems and Development Programme (LEAD), he donated the archive on 23 January 2020 to the Naturalis Center of Biodiversity in Leiden.

References 

  Obituary.

Further reading 
 

1864 births
1925 deaths
Physical anthropologists
Eye color